The First Time Is the Last Time is a 1989 Hong Kong action drama film directed by Raymond Leung and starring Andy Lau, Carrie Ng, Season Ma, and Meg Lam.

Plot

Ma Yuk-fung (Season Ma) is a simple-minded girl who would blindly do anything for love. Under the instigation of her triad member boyfriend Robert, Yuk-fung goes into prison to kill Winnie Wong to avenge Robert's triad boss, Man (Lam Chung). Yuk-fung was then guilty of drug possession and was imprisoned for six months. In prison, Yuk-fung misses Robert day and night, oblivious to the fact that Robert is just using her. In prison, Yuk-fung is bullied by inmate He-man, but fortunately gets help from inmates Crazy Bitch (Carrie Ng) and 5354 (Meg Lam) to avoid further bullying.

5354 is a recidivist who intentionally got pregnant before imprisonment whereby her sentence is halved. Nevertheless, 5354 and her child's father have feelings towards each other.

Crazy Bitch is a disfigured murder felon who gives herself up in prison and often causes trouble. Later, due to Yuk-fung's sincere attitude, Crazy Bitch brightens up. They often talk about their own past. Crazy Bitch had a poor childhood where her family lived on a boat. As a child, she was sold by her drug addict father and became a prostitute who also got addicted to drugs. One night, she was harassed in a nightclub and was saved by a triad member, Yung (Andy Lau). The next day, Yung also negotiated with a rival gang for her and Yung was injured during a chaotic fight. Yung hid with Crazy Bitch in the public restroom, and they became affectionate. Soon after, Crazy Bitch cohabited with Yung, which during that time, Yung helped her get rid of her drug addiction and she actively lived a new life. The two spent their happiest moments together. Later, Yung turned out to be an undercover cop who abhorred injustice as his foe. Crazy Bitch worried that his operation would fail and requested that they immigrate and start a new life in Canada together. Yung was then killed at the final moment by Man and Crazy Bitch's hopes were destroyed. Crazy Bitch avenged Yung and killed Man and his underlings in a sauna and was thus, sentenced to prison. In the process, she was also disfigured by a burning sauna stone.

Yuk-fung finds a kitten in prison and secretly takes care of it. The friendship of Yuk-fung, Crazy Bitch and 5354 enhances over time. Yuk-fung and 5354 also look forward to their new lives with their boyfriend after their release from prison. But good times do not last as Crazy Bitch finds out in prison that her father died from drug abuse. Yuk-fung also discovers her assassination target, Winnie Wong, is actually Crazy Bitch. 5354 is then killed by a mentally disturbed inmate, Jenny (Ngai Suet), and her unborn baby is also killed.

Yuk-fung thinks highly of her friendship with Winnie and refuses to abide with Robert. On the day of her release, Yuk-fung leaves with her kitten, waiting for Robert to pick her up but the conscienceless Robert runs her over with his car and crushes her to death. The kitten flees back into the prison and Winnie picks it up where the film ends with her sad expression.

Cast
Andy Lau as Yung
Carrie Ng as Crazy Bitch / Winnie Wong
Season Ma as Ma Yuk-fung, Inmate 7144
Meg Lam as Inmate 5354
Ngai Suet as Jenny
Kenneth Tsang as Jenny's father
Wang Lung-wei as Keung's triad boss
Andy Tai as Chief Inspector Chan
Kan Tat-wah as Keung
Peter Ngo as Yung's cop partner
Lam Chung as Man
Law Yiu-hung as Member of Keung's triad
Lam Wai-man
Yeung Kit-ngai
Wan Po-yee
Yeung Kin-wai as Prison Officer Lee
Ng Fung-ching
Kan Sam-mei
Garry Chan as Drug dealer shot by CI Chan
Yiu Wai-ming
Dora Chu
Law Shu-kei as Chief of prison
Wong Hung as Whoremonger
Chan Kit-ling
Lau Shung-fung as Triad member

Box office
The film grossed HK$7,969,241 at the Hong Kong box office during its theatrical run from 15 to 27 April 1989 in Hong Kong.

See also
Andy Lau filmography

External links

The First Time Is the Last Time at Hong Kong Cinemagic

1989 films
Hong Kong action drama films
Police detective films
Triad films
Women in prison films
1980s Cantonese-language films
Films set in Hong Kong
Films shot in Hong Kong
1980s action drama films
1980s police films
1989 directorial debut films
1989 drama films
1980s prison films
Hong Kong prison films
1980s Hong Kong films